John Timothy Callahan (March 29, 1895 – May 14, 1976) was an American football player and coach. He attended preparatory school at the Phillips Academy in Andover, Massachusetts, and then enrolled at Yale University.  He played college football at the guard position for the Yale Bulldogs in 1916 and 1919 to 1920, and was a consensus first-team selection on the 1920 College Football All-America Team.  His education at Yale was interrupted during World War I by service as a pilot in the Naval Aviation Corps.  He was stationed at Newport, Rhode Island, and later in South America, before being discharged in 1919.  Callahan was captain of the 1920 Yale Bulldogs football team while his brother Henry "Mike" Callahan was captain of the 1920 Princeton Tigers football team.

Head coaching record

References

1895 births
1976 deaths
American football guards
Colorado Mines Orediggers football coaches
Yale Bulldogs football players
All-American college football players
United States Navy personnel of World War I
Sportspeople from Lawrence, Massachusetts
Players of American football from Massachusetts
United States Naval Aviators
Military personnel from Massachusetts